Neil Ryan Alberico (born October 7, 1992) is a racing driver from Los Gatos, California, United States.

Alberico made his professional debut in the 2012 U.S. F2000 National Championship from JDC Motorsports. He returned to the series in 2013 from Cape Motorsports Wayne Taylor Racing.  In 2014 he moved up the Road to Indy ladder into the Pro Mazda Championship.

Motorsports career results

American open–wheel racing results

U.S. F2000 National Championship

Pro Mazda Championship

Indy Lights

* Season still in progress

References

External links
  
 

1992 births
Living people
Indy Lights drivers
Indy Pro 2000 Championship drivers
People from Redlands, California
Racing drivers from California
Racing drivers from San Jose, California
Sportspeople from San Bernardino County, California
U.S. F2000 National Championship drivers
Carlin racing drivers
JDC Motorsports drivers
Team Pelfrey drivers
Wayne Taylor Racing drivers